Jordi (stylized in all caps) is the seventh studio album by American band Maroon 5. It was released on June 11, 2021, through 222, Interscope and Polydor Records. The album features guest appearances from Megan Thee Stallion, Blackbear, Stevie Nicks, Bantu, H.E.R., YG, and late rappers Juice Wrld and Nipsey Hussle. The deluxe edition of the album features additional guest appearances from Anuel AA, Tainy, and Jason Derulo. It is the band's first album in four years since their 2017 album Red Pill Blues, and also their 1st album without bassist Mickey Madden following his arrest in 2020 due to domestic violence (though some of his contributions are heard on tracks 10 & 12).

The album is titled after a nickname of the band's late manager Jordan Feldstein, who died in 2017. The album received mixed to negative reviews from critics.

Background
1 month after the release of Red Pill Blues In November 2017. in December 2017, the band's manager and Adam Levine's childhood friend Jordan Feldstein died of a pulmonary embolism aged 40. Feldstein was the older brother of  actors Jonah Hill and Beanie Feldstein. Two years later, the band dedicated the song "Memories" to him. The song went on to become a worldwide success—it is the first single released from the album and it appears on the track listing in two versions (alongside the original version of the song, the album also includes a remix, featuring American rappers Nipsey Hussle & YG). The album was recorded between 2019 and 2021 (prior to and during the COVID-19 pandemic).

In March 2021, the band announced the album and was available for pre-order on April 29, 2021. The track listing for the deluxe edition was announced on May 24, 2021.

Singles
The album is promoted by five singles. The first single, "Memories", was released on September 20, 2019. The song debuted at number 22 on the Billboard Hot 100, later peaking at number 2 and becoming the band's tenth top-5 single, as well as their fifteenth top-10 single. The second single, "Nobody's Love", was released on July 24, 2020. The song was inspired by the COVID-19 pandemic and the George Floyd protests. It peaked at 41 and 119 on the US Billboard Hot 100 and Billboard Global 200, respectively. 

The third single, "Beautiful Mistakes", a collaboration with American rapper Megan Thee Stallion, was released on March 3, 2021, with a lyric video released the same day. The official music video was released on March 11, 2021, and was directed by Sophie Muller. The song peaked at 13 and 26 on the US Billboard Hot 100 and Global 200, respectively. The fourth single, "Lost", was released alongside the album on June 11, 2021, along with an official music video. The fifth and final single "Lovesick", was sent to Italian radio on January 7, 2022.

Musician Bantu released a remix version of the album's song "One Light" on August 5, 2022, with the band and featuring artists Yung Bleu and Latto.

Critical reception

Jordi received mixed to negative reviews from critics. At Metacritic, which assigns a normalised rating out of 100 to reviews from mainstream critics, the album has an average score of 48 out of 100, based on 9 reviews. This is the lowest score of any the 381 albums listed on Metacritic from 2021.

Writing for NME, El Hunt reported that, with Jordi, Maroon 5 were "more visible, and, at times, vulnerable", describing the two versions of "Memories" as "sharp pop songs with both substance and heart". Talking about the collaborations, Hunt detailed that Stevie Nicks' contribution to "Remedy" sounded like "a corrupted Siri singing country-western", and described Jason Derulo's collaboration with Levine, "Lifestyle," as "silly" and "slightly overdone". She remarked that the addition of Juice Wrld on "Can't Leave You Alone" "serves little purpose", and that his verse is "wedged into the middle of an otherwise unremarkable break-up song".

In a negative review, Kate Solomon of i described the songs on the album as "generic but hypnotic melodies over generic but danceable beats", going on to say 
that the songs were "banal" and "advertisement-friendly". While Solomon highlighted the inclusion of H.E.R. and Megan Thee Stallion, she described the posthumous appearances by Nipsey Hussle and Juice Wrld as "unmemorable". Solomon went on to remark that the album is "perfectly crafted to please crowds, to slip into your consciousness without you really realising ". In a similar review, The Guardian Alexis Petridis described the album as "a plethora of well-worn 21st-century pop tropes – tropical house sounds, post-Tame Impala floaty synths – but nothing you would describe as novel in the music or lyrics". He likened Maroon 5 to blank canvas, saying that the band was "reliant on guest artists to inject personality and songwriters and producers to come up with the goods". He highlighted Bantu and Thee Stallion's contributions, describing them as "fiery" and "a surprise", respectively, but went on to describe the rest of the album as a "mixed bag", and remarked that the songs felt "too calculated for their own good".

Commercial performance 
In the United States, Jordi debuted at number eight on the Billboard 200 with first week sales of 37,000 equivalent units, which consisted of 15,000 pure album sales, marking the group's lowest first week album sales. Despite this, it also marks the group's seventh top ten effort on the charts since their debut album Songs About Jane. As of June 22, 2021, the album has been certified gold by the Recording Industry Association of America (RIAA), for moving 500,000 units in the country alone.

Track listing

Notes
Regarding the digital versions of the album, the original version of "Memories" only appears on the deluxe edition, as track 11, followed by the remix as track 12.
 indicates a main and vocal producer
 indicates an additional producer
 indicates a co-producer
 indicates a vocal producer

Personnel
Credits adapted from Tidal.

Maroon 5
 Adam Levine – vocals (all tracks), guitar (9), bass (8)
 Jesse Carmichael – guitar (5, 7–12), keyboards (7, 11–12)
 James Valentine – guitar (1, 2, 4, 5, 7–12)
 Matt Flynn – drums, percussion (5, 8, 10–12)
 PJ Morton – keyboards (5–12), organ (4)
 Sam Farrar – bass (5–7), keyboards (11–12), additional vocals (5, 7)
 Mickey Madden – bass (10–12) (former member at time of release)

Additional musicians
 
 Megan Thee Stallion – rap (1)
 Matthew Musto – rap (3), keyboards (1), programming (1)
 Andrew Goldstein – guitar, keyboards (1, 4); programming (1)
 Jon Bellion – background vocals (2)
 Michael Pollack – background vocals (2, 9, 11, 12), keyboards (11, 12)
 The Monsters & Strangerz – programming (2, 11)
 Cirkut – programming, synthesizer (3); drum programming (8)
 Gabe Simon – 5-string banjo, background vocals, guitar, keyboards, whistle (4)
 Mikky Ekko – background vocals, guitar, keyboards (4)
 John DeBold – additional keyboards, drum programming, guitar, synthesizer programming (5)
 Noah "Mailbox" Passovoy – additional vocals (5), keyboards (5, 10), percussion (5, 8)
 Blake Slatkin – additional vocals, bass, drums, guitar, programming (6)
 KBeazy – drums, keyboards (6)
 Kid Bloom – additional vocals (8)
 Jesse Perlman – guitar (8)
 Nija Charles – background vocals (9)
 Pierre-Luc Rioux – guitar (9)
 Andrew Watt – bass, drums, guitar, percussion (10)
 Louis Bell – drums, keyboards, percussion, programming (10)

Technical personnel

 Randy Merrill – mastering engineer (1–12, 14)
 Serban Ghenea – mixer, engineer (1–12, 14)
 Noah "Mailbox" Passovoy – recording engineer (1–10, 14), engineer (11, 12), vocal engineer (14)
 John DeBold – recording engineer (5)
 John Hanes – engineer (2–12)
 Shawn "Source" Jarrett – vocal engineer (1)
 Karen Johnston – vocal engineer (5)
 Ben Hogarth – vocal engineer (14)
 Sam Schamberg – assistant recording engineer (1–10, 14)
 Ashley Jacobson – assistant recording engineer (2)
 Eric Eylands – assistant recording engineer (2, 5, 8)
 Bo Bodnar – assistant recording engineer (11, 12)

Charts

Weekly charts

Year-end charts

Certifications

Release history

References

2021 albums
Maroon 5 albums
222 Records albums
Albums produced by Boi-1da
Albums produced by Cirkut
Albums produced by Andrew Goldstein (musician)
Albums produced by Blackbear (musician)
Albums produced by the Monsters & Strangerz
Albums produced by Ryan Ogren
Albums impacted by the COVID-19 pandemic
Interscope Records albums
Polydor Records albums
Albums in memory of deceased persons